Foden may refer to:
Ben Foden (born 1985), English rugby union player
Edward Edgar Foden (1913–1985), English engineer
Giles Foden (born 1967), British author
Phil Foden (born 2000), English footballer
Wendy Foden (born 1975), South African conservation biologist
William Foden (1860–1947), American composer and guitarist

See also
Foden Trucks, a former British truck and bus manufacturer
Foden NC, a double-decker bus built by Foden in the 1970s
Foden's Band, a brass band connected with Foden's truck and bus manufacturers